The Taiwan Futsal League is a Taiwanese men's futsal league founded in 2021 by Chinese Taipei Football Association.

History 
In the 2021 season, Chiayi TienChing won the league with a perfect season of ten wins. The team also clinched all the awards, Best Coach, Golden Boot, Golden Glove and Fair Play award.

Clubs

Timeline

Winners

Awards

MVP of the year

Best Coach

Golden boot

Golden glove

Fair play award

References 

Futsal
Taiwan
2021 establishments in Taiwan
Sports leagues established in 2021
Professional sports leagues in Taiwan